Nicoll is a surname. Notable people with the surname include:

 Adele Nicoll (born 1996), Welsh shot putter, discus thrower and bobsledder
 Alexander Nicoll, a Scottish orientalist
 Archibald Nicoll (1886–1953), a New Zealand artist
 Courtlandt Nicoll (1880–1938), New York state senator
 David Nicoll (anarchist) (1859–1919), British anarchist
 David Nicoll (footballer), Scottish footballer
 De Lancey Nicoll (1854–1931), New York lawyer 
 Fergus Nicoll, broadcaster and journalist
 Helen Nicoll (1937–2012), English children's author
 James Nicoll, Canadian Usenet figure
 John Fearns Nicoll Colonial Secretary of Hong Kong from 1949 to 1952, and British Colonial Governor of Singapore from 1952 to 1955
 Matthias Nicoll (1630–December 22, 1687), aka Nicolls, was 6th Mayor of New York City from 1672 to 1673
 Maurice Nicoll, Scottish follower of G. I. Gurdjieff
 Michael John Nicoll (1880–1925), British ornithologist
 Nathaniel Lee Nicoll, American musician B! Machine
 Robert Nicoll, Scottish poet
 William Robertson Nicoll, Scottish editor
 James Henderson Nicoll (1863–1921), Scottish paediatric surgeon

Place
Nicoll Highway, a road in Singapore
Nicoll Highway MRT station, a place in Singapore

See also 
 Nicol
 Nichol
 Nicholl
 Nicolls
 Nicholls (disambiguation)
 Niccol

English-language surnames
Patronymic surnames
Surnames from given names